2020 VV is an Apollo near-Earth asteroid roughly  in diameter. On 20 November 2020, the asteroid had a 4.4% chance of impacting Earth on 12 October 2033 11:43 UT. As of mid-December 2020, the asteroid has a modest 61 day observation arc. With a diameter range of 10–22 meters the asteroid could be as large as the Chelyabinsk meteor.

It has a very low 0.35° orbital inclination with respect to the ecliptic plane and an Earth-MOID of only 14,800 km.

Where Earth will be on a given date is known, but given the short observation arc where precisely the asteroid will be on its orbit in 2033 is not. A slight variation in the known orbit of the asteroid can cause the asteroid to be early, right on time (impact solution), or late.

Impact probabilities are calculated independently by Sentry, NEODyS-2 and ESA's Space Situational Awareness Programme. Different models result in slightly different orbit solutions, nominal close approach distances, and impact probabilities. With a long enough observation arc these solutions will converge. In general when the nominal approach is closer to the impact scenario, the odds of impact are greater.

The line of variation (risk corridor) for 2033 passed over the northeastern USA, Spain, Saudi Arabia, India, and China.

The greatest chances of impact were listed between 17 and 20 November 2020. On 17 November 2020 the Space Situational Awareness Programme listed a 4.2% chance (1 in 24) of impact, Sentry listed a 2.8% chance (1 in 36), and NEODyS-2 listed a cumulative 5.9% chance of impact. By 20 November 2020 with a 15-day observation arc NEODyS-2 listed a 4.4% chance (1 in 23) of impact. At the same time, Sentry listed a 1.3% chance (1 in 77) of impact, and the Space Situational Awareness Programme listed a 1.6% chance (1 in 63).

2020 VV is not categorized as a potentially hazardous object, because the estimated size is significantly smaller than the threshold of about 140 meters for potentially hazardous objects.

Notes

References

External links 
 
 
 Table of Asteroids Next Closest Approaches to the Earth  Osservatorio Astronomico Sormano 
 Sentry (6 Nov 2020) with impact years ranging from 2027-2118 / 2020 VV entries  – hohmanntransfer
 Asteroid Hazards, Part 3: Finding the Path – YouTube video by the Minor Planet Center (26 August 2015)

Minor planet object articles (unnumbered)
Discoveries by MLS
Potential impact events caused by near-Earth objects
20201021
20201105